Edwin “Ed” Chau (born September 17, 1957) is an American jurist and politician who served in the California State Assembly as a Democrat representing the 49th state assembly District from 2012 to 2021. On November 29, 2021, California Governor Gavin Newsom appointed Chau to be a judge in the Los Angeles County Superior Court.

Biography 
Ed Chau (Chinese name: 周本立 ) was born in Hong Kong in 1957 and grew up in Los Angeles. He has a B.A. in sociology and a B.S. in computer science from the University of Southern California. He also received a J.D. degree from Southwestern University School of Law.

California State Assembly 
In June, 2021, Chau was appointed by the Speaker of the Assembly to serve as the Assistant Majority Leader. Prior to the appointment, Chau served as the Chairman of the Assembly Committee on Privacy and Consumer Protection from 2016 to 2021. Previously, he was the Chairman of the Assembly Committee on Housing and Community Development. Chau also served as a member of the following standing committees: Appropriations, Judiciary, Jobs, Economic Development and the Economy, Natural Resources, and Privacy and Consumer Protection.

In addition, Chau was the Chairman of the Assembly Select Committee on Emerging Technologies and Innovation. As Chair, he had convened informational hearings on the Internet of Things (IoT), Artificial Intelligence, Facial Recognition Technology, 5-G Technology, and Mobile Applications, among others. He was also a member of the following Select Committees: Asia/California Trade and Investment Promotion, California's Clean Energy Economy, Cybersecurity, and Regional Transportation Solutions.

In 2018, Chau introduced and passed the landmark privacy law, alongside Senator Robert Hertzberg, the California Consumer Privacy Act of 2018 (CCPA), giving California consumers significant control over the collection, use and processing of their personal information. The law, considered the most comprehensive privacy law in the nation, has frequently been compared to the European Union landmark privacy law, the General Data Protection Regulation (GDPR).

In addition, Chau passed a law that would require data brokers to publicly register with the Attorney General's office, providing Californians transparent information about who is collecting their personal information. Other laws passed by Chau include prohibiting the sale, purchase and use of hacked data; making it a crime to assist in soliciting another to commit hacking; requiring credit reporting agencies to fix vulnerabilities regarding data breaches; protecting individuals' privacy from devices like drones; authorizing the California Military Department to conduct cybersecurity assessments in schools; requiring disclosure of a data breach to California residents when the encryption key is lost; and authorizing local governments to provide broadband services, while adhering to “net neutrality rules”. Chau also introduced legislation to safeguard personal data collected by digital health trackers. as well as address biases in the use of automated artificial intelligence systems.

Moreover, Chau passed laws to help curb climate change; protect water resources through groundwater cleanup funding; combat wild fires through forest management; protect seniors against elder abuse; require Emergency Medical Technicians (EMTs) to receive training on how to interact with dementia patients and their caregivers; mandate advance notice before increasing life insurance costs on consumers; ensure that students in California receive instruction on the Chinese Exclusion Act of 1882 and the contributions made by Chinese Americans in establishing the Transcontinental Railroad; protect students by removing from classrooms teachers charged with a sex offense; safeguard children from cyber sexual bullying; prohibit the online marketing of cannabis products or services to minors; and legally protect Good Samaritans that break into hot vehicles to rescue children.

Chau also passed a number of legislative measures to address the housing crisis; assist with language access in hospital settings and the language accessibility needs of voters; and to help small business owners facing frivolous lawsuits.

Electoral history

2012 California State Assembly

2014 California State Assembly

2016 California State Assembly

2018 California State Assembly

2020 California State Assembly

See also
List of Asian American jurists

References

External links 
 Join California Edwin Chau

Democratic Party members of the California State Assembly
1957 births
Living people
Asian American and Pacific Islander state legislators in California
People from Arcadia, California
University of Southern California alumni
Southwestern Law School alumni
21st-century American politicians